Pocono Township is a township in Monroe County, Pennsylvania. The township's government is located in the village of Tannersville, Pennsylvania, near the site of Camelback Mountain Resort, which is located in the Pocono Mountains and the adjacent Jackson Township. The top of the ski area is within Big Pocono State Park, which is maintained by resort staff. The population was 10,868 at the 2020 census.

Geography
According to the United States Census Bureau, the township has a total area of 34.4 square miles (89.1 km2), of which 34.2 square miles (88.6 km2)  is land and 0.2 square mile (0.5 km2)  (0.55%) is water.

Demographics

As of the census of 2000, there were 9,607 people, 3,503 households, and 2,634 families residing in the township. The population density was 280.8 people per square mile (108.4/km2). There were 4,250 housing units at an average density of 124.2/sq mi (48.0/km2). The racial makeup of the township was 90.21% White, 4.10% African American, 0.15% Native American, 1.33% Asian, 0.07% Pacific Islander, 2.25% from other races, and 1.89% from two or more races. Hispanic or Latino of any race were 5.70% of the population.

There were 3,503 households, out of which 36.0% had children under the age of 18 living with them, 63.4% were married couples living together, 7.9% had a female householder with no husband present, and 24.8% were non-families. 19.1% of all households were made up of individuals, and 6.2% had someone living alone who was 65 years of age or older. The average household size was 2.73 and the average family size was 3.16.

In the township the population was spread out, with 26.1% under the age of 18, 7.0% from 18 to 24, 29.4% from 25 to 44, 26.5% from 45 to 64, and 11.1% who were 65 years of age or older. The median age was 38 years. For every 100 females, there were 98.0 males. For every 100 females age 18 and over, there were 94.6 males.

The median income for a household in the township was $46,107, and the median income for a family was $51,018. Males had a median income of $40,990 versus $25,596 for females. The per capita income for the township was $21,452. About 4.1% of families and 6.0% of the population were below the poverty line, including 5.1% of those under age 18 and 6.1% of those age 65 or over.

History
Pocono is a Native American name purported to mean "a stream between two mountains".

Pocono Township was created as a separate township by a decree of the courts of Northampton County, Pennsylvania in November 1816. It is bounded on the north by Tunkhannock and Tobyhanna townships, east by Coolbaugh and Paradise townships and west by Jackson Township. It took its name from the mountains which extend across it. Pocono Township comprises .

In 1830 the population was 564; in 1840 the population was 973; in 1980 the population was 5,772; in 1990 the population was 7,550.

The Pocono Manor Historic District was listed on the National Register of Historic Places in 1997.  The Swiftwater Inn was demolished in 2007, and delisted in 2010.

Climate

According to the Trewartha climate classification system, Pocono Township has a Temperate Continental climate (Dc) with warm summers (b), cold winters (o) and year-around precipitation (Dcbo). Dcbo climates are characterized by at least one month having an average mean temperature ≤ , four to seven months with an average mean temperature ≥ , all months with an average mean temperature <  and no significant precipitation difference between seasons. Although most summer days are comfortably humid in Pocono Township, episodes of heat and high humidity can occur with heat index values > . July is the peak month for thunderstorm activity, which correlates with the average warmest month of the year. The average wettest month is September, which correlates with tropical storm remnants during the peak of the Atlantic hurricane season. Since 1981, the wettest calendar day was 6.32 inches (161 mm) on September 30, 2010. Episodes of extreme cold and wind can occur with wind chill values < . The average snowiest month is January, which correlates with the average coldest month of the year. Ice storms and large snowstorms depositing ≥ 12 inches (30 cm) of snow occur once every couple of years, particularly during nor’easters from December through March.

Transportation

Interstate 80 is the most prominent highway serving Pocono Township. It follows the Keystone Shortway along a northwest-southeast alignment across western and southern portions of the township. Pennsylvania Route 191 briefly crosses the eastern tip of the township on a north-south alignment. Pennsylvania Route 314 follows a northwest-southeast alignment along the northeastern edge of the township. Pennsylvania Route 611 follows a north-south alignment through the center of the township. Finally, Pennsylvania Route 715 follows a southwest-northeast alignment through the middle of the township.

Ecology

According to the A. W. Kuchler U.S. potential natural vegetation types, Pocono Township would have a dominant vegetation type of Appalachian Oak (104) with a dominant vegetation form of Eastern Hardwood Forest (25). The peak spring bloom typically occurs in late-April and peak fall color usually occurs in mid-October.

References

External links

Pocono Mountains
Populated places established in 1750
Townships in Monroe County, Pennsylvania
Townships in Pennsylvania